The Muisca antpitta (Grallaria rufula sensu stricto) is a bird in the family Grallariidae. The species was first described by Frédéric de Lafresnaye in 1843. It was formerly considered to be the rufous antpitta, which in 2020 was found to be a species complex composed of 13 species, including the bicolored antpitta. It is endemic to the eastern Andes in northern Colombia and western Venezuela.

Taxonomy 
The Muisca antpitta inherited the scientific name (Grallaria rufula) after the rufous antpitta's taxonomic split because the type specimen for G. rufula was found near Bogotá in what is now recognized as the Muisca antpitta's range. The 12 species resulting from the split were separated based on plumage, vocalization and genetic evidence.

The newly revised Muisca antpitta has no subspecies and is thus monotypic.

The common name was chosen in 2020 for the Muisca civilization of the eastern Andes, which continues to this day in contemporary Colombian society. The specific name, rufula, comes from the Latin for 'red-headed' or rufous.

Distribution and habitat 
The Muisca antpitta is found in a tiny portion of Táchira, Venezuela and through northern-central Colombia. It is found at elevations of 1,850–3,800 m. It inhabits humid montane forests and is most commonly found in the understory and on the forest floor.

It is separated from the closely related Perijá antpitta by the Serranía de Los Motilones mountain range, and it is separated from most of the Equatorial antpitta population by the Magdalena river valley.

Conservation 
The rufous antpitta was considered to be of least concern by the IUCN Red List, but since the taxonomic split a re-evaluation of the resulting species is necessary. The Perijá antpitta is already rated endangered by the IUCN.

References 

Birds of Venezuela
Birds of Colombia
Grallaria